Lonnie Kjer (née Devantier; born 28 November 1972) is a Danish singer best known for having represented Denmark in the Eurovision Song Contest.

Kjer was born in Middelfart, and represented her country in the 1990 Eurovision Song Contest with the song "Hallo Hallo". The song finished 8th with 64 points.

External links
 Official Website
 

1972 births
Living people
People from Middelfart Municipality
Eurovision Song Contest entrants for Denmark
Eurovision Song Contest entrants of 1990
Danish people of French descent
21st-century Danish women singers